Big Oak Tree State Park is a state-owned nature preserve with recreational features encompassing  in East Prairie, Missouri, United States. The state park was established in a large expanse of drained cropland in 1938 to protect some of the largest trees in the state and in the nation. The park was declared a National Natural Landmark in May 1986, recognized as a rare, untouched wet-mesic bottomland hardwood forest in the Mississippi Alluvial Plain portion of the Gulf Coastal Plain.

List of champion trees
Big Oak Tree State Park is the home of many current and past state and national champion trees—trees that are, for their species, the largest in the state or in the nation.

Activities and amenities
The park has two trails for hiking through the forest, including an accessible boardwalk trail, plus an interpretive center along the boardwalk and picnicking facilities.

References

External links

Big Oak Tree State Park Missouri Department of Natural Resources
Big Oak Tree State Park Map Missouri Department of Natural Resources

Protected areas of Mississippi County, Missouri
National Natural Landmarks in Missouri
State parks of Missouri
IUCN Category III
Protected areas established in 1937
Nature centers in Missouri